The Barbuda Council is a local authority that manages the internal affairs on the island of Barbuda.

History and electoral system
The Barbuda Council was established in 1976 by the Barbuda Local Government Act. It is an 11-member body consisting of nine directly elected and two ex officio (Barbuda's House and Senate representatives in the national Parliament) members who serve four-year terms.

Elections are held every two years in March with four seats and five seats becoming vacant at alternative polls.

Councillors serve for four years with elections held every two years in March.

Committees 
The Barbuda Council has five different committees: Finance, Works and General Purposes, Health, Social Welfare and Disaster, Tourism, Sports, Culture and Youth Affairs, and Agriculture, Land, Forestry, Fisheries, Coastal/Marine Protection.

Barbuda's secession request 
The government is taking the unprecedented step of presenting the matter to the Parliament after it received a letter from the Barbuda Council requesting that discussions commence on the separation of Barbuda from Antigua and Barbuda In the letter dated 31 August 2020, Council Secretary, Paul Nedd, informed Cabinet Secretary, Konata Lee, that the Barbuda Council wished to secede from Antigua in order to determine a separate future for Barbuda and its people.

2019 elections 
An election was held on 27 March 2019 to select four council members. Eight candidates participated in the poll.

Calsey Joseph, Freeston Thomas, Jacqui Frank and Sherina Myre on the Barbuda Peoples Movement (BPM) ticket

Hesketh Daniel, Kelcina Burton-George, Relton Lynch and Arthur Nibbs were named as candidates for the Antigua-Barbuda Labour Party (ABLP)

Chair of the Barbuda Council
Below is a table of Chairs of the Barbuda Council:

Members

See also
Antigua and Barbuda
Commonwealth Local Government Forum-Americas

References

External links
Barbuda Council: Public Relations

Barbuda Council
Barbuda
Politics of Antigua and Barbuda
Government of Barbuda
Barbuda
Government agencies established in 1976
1976 establishments in Antigua and Barbuda
Local government in Antigua and Barbuda